Walter J. Hinneberg is a shipbroker and real estate investor from Hamburg, Germany. In 1958 he founded the Walter J. Hinneberg Company in Hamburg. Hinneberg owns the land under 40 Wall Street in New York City. Donald Trump purchased the building from the Kinson Company and renegotiated the land lease with Hinneberg in 1995.

References

Businesspeople in shipping
Businesspeople from Hamburg
German investors
German landowners
Living people
Year of birth missing (living people)